The family tree of the Egyptian 19th Dynasty is the usual mixture of conjecture and interpretation. The family history starts with the appointment of Ramesses I as the successor to Horemheb, the last king of the 18th Dynasty who had no heirs. From Rameses' line came perhaps the greatest king of the New Kingdom of Egypt, Rameses II. He ruled for nearly 67 years and had many children (see List of children of Ramses II).

Following Ramesses II's death, his granddaughter declined the throne and the succession remains unclear. The parentage of Pharaoh Amenmesse and his exact relation to Siptah is unknown.

References

Bibliography 
 

Family tree

19
13th century BC in Egypt
12th century BC in Egypt
13th-century BC people
12th-century BC people